Glory is a fictional Image Universe comic book superheroine created by Rob Liefeld. She first appeared in Youngblood Strikefile (vol. 1) #1 (1993), and initially starred in books published by Liefeld's Extreme Studios, which was a partner studio of Image Comics, a publisher that Liefeld co-founded in 1992. Following Liefeld's departure from that publisher, the character went on to appear in books published by Liefeld's subsequent endeavor, Awesome Comics. A homage to Wonder Woman, Gloriana Demeter is a half-Amazonian, half-Demon warrior.

Publication history

Rob Liefeld's version
Glory is the result of an alliance between the Lady Demeter of the Amazonians and the demon Lord Silverfall of the Underworld. Raised in her mother's world and trained by the Amazonians, she emerged as their finest warrior. However, she also struggles to control the savagery which is her paternal gift/curse. Not at home in either Amazonia or the Underworld, Glorianna goes to the world of man.

During World War II, Glorianna fights for the Allied forces against the Nazis, alongside Supreme. For a time she works with Die-Hard and SuperPatriot as the team called 'Allies'. She is part of the second and third Brigade teams with other superheroes.

Alan Moore's version
Writer Alan Moore joined Image after leaving DC Comics and spending a period of time working for independent companies. As he did on other Liefeld works like Supreme and Youngblood, Moore relaunched Glory in March 1999 under the Awesome Comics line. Blending mythology, adventure, and romance to the superheroine much as he would shortly do in his subsequent series for ABC Comics, Promethea.

In the retooling, Glory takes on a human identity by a waitress named "Gloria West", in order to experience humanity. Only one issue was published (#0), but it was eventually republished with two additional issues for Avatar Press in 2001. This version also had an extended backstory, once supervising a team called 'Danger Damsels' decades ago.

Joe Keatinge's version
In 2012, Joe Keatinge was the writer for a relaunched Glory ongoing series with artist Sophie Campbell. The series was not renumbered and began with issue #23 and lasted until issue #34. Glory's history is retooled, establishing the Amazons and Demons as extraterrestrials. Glory was also redesigned to be an albino, more muscular and covered in battle scars.

References

External links
List of the various editions
Comic Book DB page on Glory 

Comics characters introduced in 1993
Extreme Studios titles
Awesome Comics titles
Maximum Press titles
Avatar Press titles
Comics characters who can teleport
Image Comics characters with superhuman strength
Image Comics female superheroes
Fictional characters with albinism
Fictional half-demons
Fictional women soldiers and warriors
Arcade Comics characters
Characters created by Rob Liefeld
Fictional Amazons
Fictional World War II veterans